is a Japanese manga series written by Gosho Aoyama and illustrated by Takahiro Arai. It is a spin-off and prequel to the Case Closed manga by Gosho Aoyama. It was serialized in Shogakukan's Weekly Shōnen Sunday from October 2019 to November 2020, with its chapters collected in two tankōbon volumes. A five-episode anime television series adaptation by TMS Entertainment aired from December 2021 to March 2023.

Characters

A law enforcement prospect who entered the police academy with straight A's in all subjects. Because of his serious attitude and his blonde hair, he often gets into trouble with other students. Furuya is the only person alive out of his five colleagues.

A trainee who appears to be unpredictable and uncooperative, but his level of academic, practical, and professional knowledge is high. His father, a professional boxer, trained him in boxing. In the main series, Matsuda sacrificed himself on the Ferris Wheel in order to reveal the location where the second bomb is set. 

The strong, caring leader of the group who has excellent leadership skills. Having seen his father, a former police officer, he believes that strength is necessary for the sake of justice. In the main series, Date died of being hit by a car.

An officer who has excellent insight and communication skills and is popular with females. He and Matsuda have been close friends since elementary school. In the main series, Hagiwara died when trying to disarm a bomb in an apartment complex.

A childhood friend of Furuya's. His older brother, Takaaki, is a detective for the Nagano Prefectural Police. He is kind and sincere, and still carries the trauma of the death of his parents. In the main series, Morofushi committed suicide when his identity as a Public Security Bureau officer is exposed and he thought that a Black Organization member was going to come and kill him.

Media

Manga
Detective Conan: Police Academy Arc – Wild Police Story was written by Gosho Aoyama and illustrated by Takahiro Arai. It ran in Shogakukan's Weekly Shōnen Sunday from October 2, 2019, to November 18, 2020. The series' first arc, the Jinpei Matsuda arc, ran for three chapters in October 2019 and a promotional video narrated by Matsuda (Nobutoshi Canna) was released. The second arc, the Wataru Date arc, ran for three chapters in February 2020 and a promotional video narrated by Date (Keiji Fujiwara) was released. The third arc, the Kenji Hagiwara arc, ran for three chapters in June 2020 and a promotional video narrated by Hagiwara (Shin-ichiro Miki) was released. The fourth and final arc, the Hiromitsu Morofushi arc, ran for four chapters from October to November 2020 and a promotional video narrated by Morofushi (Hikaru Midorikawa) was released. Shogakukan collected its chapters in two tankōbon volumes, released on November 18 and December 18, 2020.

Volume list

Anime
On August 3, 2021, it was announced that the manga would receive an anime television series adaptation. It premiered on December 4, 2021, on ytv and NTV. The fifth and last episode aired on March 4, 2023. The anime aired on an irregular broadcast schedule, and is treated as part of the main Case Closed series, with Wild Police Story episodes airing in place of any regular canon or filler. Because of this, Crunchyroll licenses the series, as they have continually licensed Case Closed since 2014. It featured the regular opening and ending themes from Case Closed. The first episode uses the opening theme "Yura Yura" by Wands. The second and third episodes use the opening theme "Sleepless" by B'z. The fourth episode use the opening theme "Sparkle" by Maki Ohguro. The first episode uses the ending theme "Sweet Moonlight" by Breakerz, which is also used in the second episode. The third episode uses the ending theme  by Sard Underground. The fourth episode uses the ending theme  by All at Once feat. Yudai Ohno (from Da-ice). The fifth episode uses the ending theme  by Konya, Anomachikara and Valshe.

Episode list

Reception
Detective Conan: Police Academy Arc – Wild Police Storys first volume was the 5th best-selling manga volume in its first week, with 122,243 copies sold, and the 19th best-selling manga volume in its second week, with 44,749 copies sold. The second volume was the 9th best-selling manga volume in its first week, with 101,623 copies sold.

Notes

References

External links
Detective Conan: Police Academy Arc – Wild Police Story at Web Sunday 
Detective Conan: Police Academy Arc – Wild Police Story official anime website at YTV 

Action anime and manga
Anime series based on manga
Case Closed
Comics spin-offs
Mystery anime and manga
Police in anime and manga
Prequel comics
Shogakukan manga
Shōnen manga
TMS Entertainment